William Sage (11 November 1893 – 1968) was an English professional footballer who played for Tottenham Thursday, Corinthian, Tottenham Hotspur, Clapton Orient and Dartford.

Football career 
Sage began his playing career at youth team Tottenham Thursday before playing for Corinthians. The right half joined Tottenham Hotspur in 1919 and made 12 appearances for the "Spurs". Sage was chosen as a member of the British FA X1 which toured South Africa in 1920. After leaving White Hart Lane he played for Clapton Orient and finally Dartford.

References 

1893 births
1968 deaths
Footballers from Edmonton, London
English footballers
English Football League players
Tottenham Hotspur F.C. players
Leyton Orient F.C. players
Dartford F.C. players
Corinthian F.C. players
Association football midfielders